Worlds on Fire is the debut EP by Dutch singer Duncan Laurence. It was released on 13 May 2020 by Spark Records. The EP includes the singles "Arcade", "Love Don't Hate It" and "Someone Else".

Background
After the release of the EP, Laurence said on his Instagram account, "It’s here! My first EP ever. Please let me know in a comment what you think of the songs: which one’s your fav? Which one will you dance to? Sing along to? Cry to? Smile to? I wanna know EVERYTHING and all the feels."

Singles
"Arcade" was released as the lead single from the EP on 7 March 2019. The song peaked at number one on the Dutch Singles Chart. The song represented the Netherlands at the Eurovision Song Contest 2019. It was performed during the second semi-final and qualified for the final and went on to win the competition. "Love Don't Hate It" was released as the second single from the EP on 23 October 2019. The song peaked at number forty-one on the Dutch Singles Chart. "Someone Else" was released as the third single from the EP on 13 May 2020. The song peaked at number seventy-two on the Dutch Singles Chart.

Track listing
Credits adapted from Tidal.

Charts

References

2020 debut EPs
Duncan Laurence albums